Gennady Varenik was a KGB official who was also a CIA asset. He was arrested in East Berlin in 1985 by the KGB, interrogated using a truth drug, tried for treason and executed. He is one of the 25 Soviets betrayed by Aldrich Ames.

External links
ONE DOUBLE AGENT'S TALE: "HE SAVED AMERICAN LIVES"

References

KGB officers
Soviet people executed for spying for the United States
People executed for treason against the Soviet Union
Executed Soviet people
People executed by the Soviet Union by firearm
Year of death missing
Year of birth missing